Semyonovka is a rural locality (a selo) in Ozerkinskoye Rural Settlement, Kikvidzensky District, Volgograd Oblast, Russia. The population was 509 as of 2010. There are 4 streets.

Geography 
Semyonovka is located on Khopyorsko-Buzulukskaya plain, on the right bank of the Buzuluk River, 15 km northeast of Preobrazhenskaya (the district's administrative centre) by road. Peschanovka is the nearest rural locality.

References 

Rural localities in Kikvidzensky District